Seba Smith (September 14, 1792 – July 28, 1868) was an American humorist and writer.  He was married to Elizabeth Oakes Smith, also a writer, and he was the father of Appleton Oaksmith.

Biography
Born in Buckfield, Maine, Smith graduated from Bowdoin College in 1818 and then lived in Portland, Maine. He edited various papers, including the Eastern Argus, and founded the Portland Courier, which he edited from 1830 to 1837.

He was one of the first writers to use American vernacular in humor, likely inspired by writer and critic John Neal.  His series with the New England character Major Jack Downing was popular after its start in 1830.

Under date of November 26, 1833, John Quincy Adams records in his diary an encounter with Colonel David Crockett, newly returned to Congress, whom he quotes as saying that he (Crockett) "had taken for lodgings two rooms on the first floor of a boarding-house, where he expected to pass the winter and to have for a fellow-lodger Major Jack Downing, the only person in whom he had any confidence for information of what the Government was doing."

His dry, satirical humor influenced other 19th century humorists, including Artemus Ward and Finley Peter Dunne. He is also credited as being a forerunner of other American humorists like Will Rogers. He also penned the American folk ballad "Young Charlotte".

Select publications 

 The Life and Writings of Major Jack Downing, of Downingville, Away Down East in the State of Maine (Under pseudonym, Major Jack Downing.) (1833)
 John Smith's Letters With "Picters" to Match (1839)
 Powhatan: A Metrical Romance in Seven Cantos (1841)
 May-Day in New-York; or, House-Hunting and Moving...(Later published under the title Jack Downing's Letters.) (1845)
 Dew-Drops of the Nineteenth Century, ed. (1846)
 New Elements of Geometry (1850)
 Way Down East; or, Portraitures of Yankee Life (1854)
 My Thirty Years Out of the Senate (Under pseudonym, Major Jack Downing.) (1859)
 The Great Republic, ed. (1859)

References

External links 

 
 
 
 

1792 births
1868 deaths
American humorists
Bowdoin College alumni
People from Buckfield, Maine
Writers from Portland, Maine